Steineberg is a mountain of Bavaria, Germany. The Steineberg is part of the international project Nagelfluhkette Nature Park. The Vertical Separation of the stones Bergs is at least 83.00 meters.

Mountain fair 

Mountains of Bavaria
Mountains of the Alps

A mountain fair takes place at the end of August at the summit cross of Steineberg. It is organized by the Trachtenverein Stoineberglar and the parish council of Immenstadt-Bühl-Rauhenzell and musically accompanied by a delegation of the Akams music band.